Colorado is a geologic name applied to certain rocks of Cretaceous age in the North America, particularly in the western Great Plains. This name was originally applied to classify a group of specific marine formations of shale and chalk known for their importance in Eastern Colorado. The surface outcrop of this group produces distinctive landforms bordering the Great Plains and it is a significant feature of the subsurface of the Denver Basin and the Western Canadian Sedimentary Basin. These formations record important sequences of the Western Interior Seaway, and as the geology of this seaway was studied, this name came to be used in states beyond Colorado, but was later replaced in several of these states with more localized names.

The USGS convention has been to use Colorado Group where the rocks are further divided into formations, Colorado Formation where no beds are developed enough to be mapped as formations, and Colorado Shale where the unit is composed of little more than shale with no distinctive structures (such as in north-central Montana).

History of exploration 
 In 1862, F.B. Meek and F.V. Hayden described their “Upper Missouri River” series; Dakota, Benton, Pierre, Niobrara, and Fox Hills.

 In 1871, Hayden crossed Kansas and Colorado on the recently completed Kansas Pacific Railway, and between Abilene and Limon confirmed the whole series within the two states.

 Hayden proposed term "Colorado Group" in 1876 to embrace the Benton, Niobrara, and Pierre units for their collective exposures in the dramatic hogbacks and incised plateaus facing the Rocky Mountain front ranges of Colorado. The group was described by A. Hague and S.E. Emmons in 1877. 

 However, by 1878, C. A. White restricted the Colorado Group to the Benton and Niobrara, the formations found within the flatirons and secondary hogbacks on the east flank of the Dakota Hogback.

 During the last decade of the 19th Century, Cretaceous rocks in Colorado and western Kansas were a focus of considerable study. The Benton and Niobrara were particularly associated in the Smoky Hills of Kansas, the Arkansas River valley across southeastern Colorado, and the Colorado Front Range. G. K. Gilbert observed that of Meek and Hayden's five Cretaceous units, only the Benton and Niobrara (incidentally the Colorado Group) were chalky; moreover, the chalkiness was expressed as curiously rhythmic bedding. A well-known glaciologist, Gilbert correctly theorized that the reason for these peculiar rhythmites was periodic astronomical solar forcing, and that these rhythms were absent in the Pierre only because there was no source of carbonate in the Pierre environment. His theory was confirmed with recognitions that Milankovitch cycles can be expressed in conditions of total global absence of glaciers. Gilbert subsequently replaced the Benton with five formations based on the changes he observed in the chalkiness; non-chalky Graneros, chalky Greenhorn, non-chalky Carlile, massively chalky Timpas (Fort Hays), and chalky Apishapa.  

 The Colorado Classification was initially adopted throughout the extent of the Western Interior Seaway. However, in the 21st Century, some states, such as Wyoming and Montana, are abandoning the term. Donald E. Hattin advised that the Colorado Group should not be used in Kansas because he considered its units to be "too lithologically diverse".

Lithology
The Colorado Group consists primarily of chalky and non-chalky shale, and incorporates conglomerate, sandstone and siltstone, rhythmite beds of chalk, chalky limestone, coquinas, phosphorite, and concretionary beds including calcite, siderite, and pyrite.

The lower part includes the following sandstone members: Phillips Sandstone (below the Second White Speckled Shale),  Bowdoin Sandstone and Cardium Sandstone in the non-calcareous shale unit. The upper part includes the Martin Sandy Zone and Medicine Hat Sandstone.

Oil/gas production
Gas is produced from the sandstone members in southern Alberta, southern Saskatchewan and in Montana, such as in the Bowdoin gas field.

Distribution
Shales of middle Albian to Santonian age are distributed throughout much of the former extent of the Western Interior Seaway, including broadly from Arizona, to Iowa and Alberta. The Greenhorn-Carlile contact represents the maximum extent of the seaway of that sequence, perhaps of the entire time of the seaway; and, so, coupled with the Graneros Shale, the "old Benton" shales are the widest durable remnant of the Western Interior Seaway. Older literature may use the term Colorado Group in this extent, but several states outside of Colorado no longer use the term in current publications; nevertheless, the evidence of correlated seaway sequences and fossil patterns remains, regardless of current names. 

From Iowa to Arizona, the lithology is remarkably consistent and the bentonites and rhythmic chalk beds of the upper Greenhorn especially are geologic events that can be traced over that distance. Beyond the historic western extent of the Colorado Group usage into the Mancos Shale, the chalky beds of the group can be identified and are named accordingly, e.g, Smoky Hill, Fort Hays, Bridge Creek, Greenhorn. However, northwest of the Transcontinental Arch where western sediment sources are more dominant, altering the lithology, these names have less current use.  

The Canadian Colorado Group occurs in the sub-surface throughout southern and central Alberta, western and central Saskatchewan. It is found in outcrops along the south-western edge of the Canadian Shield. The sediments of the Colorado group exceed  in thickness in central Alberta.

Relationship to other units
The rocks of Colorado Group age are overlain by the Montana Group and underlain by the Dakota Group in the Denver Basin, Powder River Basin, and Williston Basin of the western Great Plains. In Western Canada, they are unconformably overlain by the Lea Park Formation shale and unconformably underlain by the Blairmore, Mannville or Swan River Group.

The lower part is equivalent with the Ashville Formation in eastern Saskatchewan and southern Manitoba, with the upper part corresponding to the Vermillion River Formation and Favel Formation. It is equivalent to the sum of Crowsnest Formation, Blackstone Formation, Cardium Formation, and the lower Wapiabi Formation of the Alberta Group in the Canadian Rockies foothills. It correlates with the upper Smoky Group, Dunvegan Formation, Shaftesbury Formation, Paddy Member and Labiche Formation in northern Alberta. The Colorado Group was previously named Lloydminster Shale in the Lloydminster region, but the term is now obsolete.

The Colorado Group is divided in Canada into an upper part which is calcareous, and a lower part, which is non-calcareous. The sub-units are defined at the base of two regional markers, called First and Second White Speckled Shale characterized by coccolithic debris.

Subunits
The Colorado Group includes the following sub-units, from top to bottom:

Further reading
  - Correlation chart for the field trip over outcrops of the original Colorado classification.

References

Geologic groups of North America
Stratigraphy of Alberta
Stratigraphy of British Columbia
Western Canadian Sedimentary Basin
Cretaceous Alberta
Cretaceous British Columbia
Lower Cretaceous Series of North America
Upper Cretaceous Series of North America